Bring Me the Head of the Machine Gun Woman is a 2012 Chilean action comedy that was directed by Ernesto Díaz Espinoza. The film had its world premiere on 23 September 2012 at the Austin Fantastic Fest and was released in Chile on 23 May 2013.

Synopsis
Santiago (Matías Oviedo) is a DJ and gamer who stumbles upon gangster Che Longana (Jorge Alis) and his henchmen planning a hit on a notorious bounty hunter known as "Machine Gun Woman" (Fernanda Urrejola). Caught in the act, Santiago offers to kill Machine Gun Woman and bring back her head to prove her demise, approaching the situation as he would in a violent video game.

After successfully finding Machine Gun Woman, Santiago is pursued by Che's underlings who want to kill them both. In the ensuing confrontation, Machine Gun Woman kills the henchmen but shows mercy to Santiago, who attempts to flee the city with his mother (Francisca Castillo). However, Che catches up to them and threatens to harm them if Santiago doesn't deliver Machine Gun Woman to him.

Santiago manages to locate Machine Gun Woman again, but Che tracks them down and shoots one of them during their escape. Despite this setback, the two become romantically involved and plan to take down Che once and for all. However, Santiago forgets to inform Machine Gun Woman that his mother has been captured, leading to a botched operation.

Despite the setback, Santiago and Machine Gun Woman manage to confront Che, and they ultimately succeed in killing him. Afterward, Machine Gun Woman and Santiago share a kiss before she departs, leaving Santiago to try and follow her. Unfortunately, the police stop him before he can catch up to her.

Cast
Fernanda Urrejola as La Mujer Metralleta (Machine Gun Woman)
Matías Oviedo as Santiago Fernández
Jorge Alis as Che Longana
Sofía García as Shadeline Soto
Alex Rivera as Flavio
Felipe Avello as Jonny Medina
Pato Pimienta as Pato El Conserje
Francisca Castillo as Santiago's Mom
Miguel Angel De Luca as Parguineo
Daniel Antivilo as El Tronador
Jaime Omeñaca as Bracoli

Reception
Critical reception for Bring Me the Head of the Machine Gun Woman has been mostly positive, and Film School Rejects and Complex both considered the film to be one of the best films at the Austin Fantastic Fest. The Daily Record and The List both gave the movie three stars, and the Daily Record noted that although the film had some flaws with its production it was ultimately "a fun ride that never outstays its welcome." Bloody Disgusting gave the film an overly favorable review, specifically praising actress Fernanda Urrejola's performance.

References

External links
 

2012 films
2012 action comedy films
Chilean action films
Chilean comedy films
2010s Chilean films
2010s Spanish-language films